Mateusz Taudul (born 12 November 1994 in Białystok) is a Polish professional footballer who plays as a goalkeeper for Othéllos Athiénou.

Career
Having started in his hometown, including at Jagiellonia, he has played has played for Everton's youth academy but refused to sign a professional contract.

He has since emigrated to Cyprus and established himself as a professional player there.

He was loaned out for a year from AÉK Larnaka to AÉ Zakakíou, after which he then signed a permanent contract with the latter in September 2017. He debuted for Omónia Aradíppou on 24 November 2018, in a 0-1 loss Second Division away match against Karmiótissa Páno Polemidión.
On 23 May 2019, ASIL Lysi announced that they had signed Taudul. He left by mutual consent in April 2020 just a few days before his contract expired. He trained with the newly promoted Jagiellonia Białystok II in the summer of 2020 before he returned once more to AÉ Zakakíou In February 2021 he signed a half-year contract with Olimpia Zambrów. After his contract expired, he signed for Alkí Oróklini, debuting in a 2-3 loss against Olympiás Lybión on 11 September 2021.

On 9 July 2022, he moved to Othéllos Athiénou on a one-year deal.

References

External links 

1994 births
Living people
Polish footballers
Polish expatriate footballers
Sportspeople from Białystok
Association football goalkeepers
Cypriot First Division players
Cypriot Second Division players
AEK Larnaca FC players
AEZ Zakakiou players
Omonia Aradippou players
Jagiellonia Białystok players
Everton F.C. players
ASIL Lysi players
Olimpia Zambrów players
Alki Oroklini players
Othellos Athienou F.C. players
Expatriate footballers in England
Expatriate footballers in Cyprus
Polish expatriate sportspeople in England
Polish expatriate sportspeople in Cyprus